Pointe Kurz (3,680 m) is a mountain of the Mont Blanc Massif, located on the border between France and Switzerland. It lies between the glaciers of Argentière and L'A Neuve, west of La Fouly, the closest locality.

The Pointe Kurz is the highest summit of the Aiguilles Rouges du Dolent, a small range situated between the Tour Noir and Mont Dolent.

See also
List of mountains of Switzerland named after people

References

External links
 Pointe Kurz on Hikr

Mountains of the Alps
Alpine three-thousanders
Mountains of Valais
Mountains of Haute-Savoie
France–Switzerland border
International mountains of Europe
Mountains of Switzerland